QQ refers to Tencent QQ, a Chinese instant messaging program.

QQ may also refer to:

 Q–Q plot, a plot to compare distributions in statistics
 Chery QQ, two compact Chinese cars models
 Alliance Airlines (IATA code QQ)
 Qinetiq (LSE stock symbol QQ)
 Reno Air, formerly IATA code QQ
 Q. texture, an originally Taiwanese term for the ideal texture of many foods
 QQ, the production code for the 1968 Doctor Who serial The Web of Fear
 QQ, an emoticon referring to a pair of tearing eyes
 QQ Magazine, a gay lifestyle magazine, (1969 – ca. 1982)
 QQ, a map showing an area of a quarter quadrangle

qq may refer to:
 a Perl operator

See also
 Q (disambiguation)
 QQQ (disambiguation)
 QQQQ (disambiguation)